Sadio Diao (born 31 July 1990) is a Senegalese professional footballer. 
 
Following the 2016 V.League 1, Quang Nam decided to rescind his contract with them. 
 
The African was recruited by  Khanh Hoa to reinforce their forward line. 
 
Diao formed an attacking partnership with Brazilian Claudecir while playing for Khanh Hoa.

References

External links
 at Soccerway

Senegalese footballers
Senegalese expatriate footballers
Expatriate footballers in Vietnam
Living people
Association football forwards
1990 births
Quang Nam FC players